Charles L. Geren (born October 22, 1949) is an American businessman and Republican member of the Texas House of Representatives. He represented District 89 from 2001 to 2003 before being redistricted into District 99. Both districts encompass a portion of Tarrant County.

Political career

In the 2010 Republican primary in District 93, Geren defeated Matt Krause, 8,037 (57.6 percent) to 5,915 (42.4 percent). Krause won the District 93 seat in 2012 and still holds the position.

In the general election in District 99 held on November 7, 2018, Geren with 37,944 votes (64.3 percent), defeated Democrat Michael Stakehouse, who trailed with 21,053 ballots (35.7 percent).

Geren, an ally of Joe Straus, the moderate Republican former Speaker of the Texas House of Representatives, faced unsuccessful Tea Party movement opposition in the Republican primary on March 1, 2016, from Bo French. Geren defeated French again in the March 6, 2018, Republican primary.

References

|-

1949 births
21st-century American politicians
American real estate businesspeople
American restaurateurs
Baptists from Texas
Businesspeople from Texas
Living people
Politicians from Fort Worth, Texas
Republican Party members of the Texas House of Representatives
Southern Methodist University alumni